Monalisa is a 2004 Indian Kannada-language romance film written and directed by Indrajit Lankesh. The film stars Dhyan and Sadha in lead roles and prominent actors such as Darshan and Rekha Vedavyas have done cameo appearances. The film's storyline is inspired by Parthiban Kanavu (2003).
 
The film was a blockbuster upon release and also received critical appreciation. It went on to win numerous awards at the Filmfare Awards South and Karnataka State Film Awards for the year 2004. It was also dubbed into Telugu with the same title with a reshot comedy track involving Brahmanandam and Kovai Sarala.

Cast
 Dhyan as Dhyan
 Sadha as Monalisa/Spandana (double role)
 Ramakrishna 
 Bhavya as Sarasu
 Sharan
 Rangayana Raghu as ACP Raveendra
 Umashree 
 Shankar Bhat
 Shakeela
 Vijay

Guest appearances
 Darshan
 Rekha Vedavyas
 Vanitha Vasu
 Durga Shetty
 Ruchita Prasad

Soundtrack
The music of the film was composed by Valisha-Sandeep duo. The song "Chori Chori" is inspired from Habibi Dah (Nari Narain) which was sung by Hisham Abbas and Bombay Jayashri.

Awards
 Karnataka State Film Award for Best Film
 Karnataka State Film Award for Best Director

References

External source
 Movie review
 Movie review
 Karnataka State Film Awards 2004-05
 

2004 films
2000s Kannada-language films
Indian romance films
Films directed by Indrajit Lankesh
2000s romance films